KNBC can refer to:

 KNBC, a TV station in Los Angeles
 KNBR (AM), a San Francisco radio station formerly called KNBC
 the ICAO code for Marine Corps Air Station Beaufort, in Beaufort, South Carolina, United States